Beverley Bevan (born 25 November 1944) is an English rock musician, who was the drummer and one of the original members of the Move and Electric Light Orchestra (ELO). After the end of ELO in 1986, he founded ELO Part II.

Bevan also was drummer for Black Sabbath during the Born Again Tour, and later played percussion on The Eternal Idol album in 1987. Bevan was inducted into the Rock and Roll Hall of Fame in 2017 as a member of Electric Light Orchestra.

Biography
Bevan was born in South Yardley, Birmingham, England. After attending Moseley Grammar School, where he gained two O level passes, he worked as a trainee buyer in a city centre department store called The Beehive with school friend Jasper Carrott (Robert Davis).

His professional music career started with a stint with Denny Laine in his group Denny Laine and the Diplomats, then with Carl Wayne & the Vikings, followed by the Move in 1966. The Electric Light Orchestra released their first album in 1971, by which time the Move existed only as a recording outfit. They released their final single, "California Man", in 1972.

Bevan has a deep singing voice. With the Move he sang lead on a remake of "Zing! Went the Strings of My Heart" and the country and western spoof, "Ben Crawley Steel Co". He composed one Move song: "Don't Mess Me Up", an Elvis Presley spoof from the album Message from the Country, which was also the B-side of the Move's single "Tonight". He is also, incorrectly, credited with writing the rock-blues "Turkish Tram Conductor Blues" on Looking On; Roy Wood actually composed the song.

On ELO records his voice can be heard most prominently on "Fire On High" and "Strange Magic", both from the album Face the Music (1975).

He recorded a solo single in 1976, a cover of the Sandy Nelson instrumental "Let There Be Drums". Bevan played on all Electric Light Orchestra and ELO Part II albums up to 1999. In 1980 he published a historical memoir of the Electric Light Orchestra. 

In 1983, he replaced Bill Ward in Black Sabbath for the Born Again Tour. Bevan was known for his heavy powerhouse drumming during this tour. He also appeared in Sabbath's videos "Trashed" and "Zero the Hero". A headlining appearance at the 1983 Reading Festival – extracts of which appear on a reissue of Born Again – was only Bevan's second gig with the band. "It was just all over the shop", recalled guitarist Tony Iommi. "Bev didn't know [the songs] at all. He did try. As we went on the tour, he did get a lot better… We went to America and he done good. That particular stage, doing the Reading Festival, was a definite wrong for us." Bevan rejoined Black Sabbath briefly in 1987, recording percussion overdubs for the album The Eternal Idol, but was replaced by Terry Chimes after refusing to play shows in South Africa, which was at the time under apartheid rule.

After the death of Carl Wayne in 2004, the drummer formed Bev Bevan's Move with Phil Tree and former ELO Part II colleagues Phil Bates and Neil Lockwood, to play a set comprising mostly Move classics on tour. Bates left in July 2007 to re-join ELO Part II, by then renamed to The Orchestra. Bevan was then joined by former Move guitarist Trevor Burton.

Bevan appeared on Paul Weller's 2010 album Wake Up The Nation and played drums on two songs: "Moonshine" and "Wake Up The Nation". Weller told him that he was his second choice; his first choice would have been Keith Moon.

Bevan currently presents a radio show on BBC Radio West Midlands on Sunday afternoons. He also reviews records for the Midlands newspaper Sunday Mercury and has a blog on its website. It was announced at the Best of Broad Street Awards on 17 January 2011 that Bevan would be honoured with a star on the Birmingham Walk of Stars.

Bevan is also a patron of The Dorridge Music School (Knowle). In 2012, Bevan narrated the audiobook version of Tony Iommi's biography Iron Man – My Journey Through Heaven and Hell. Bevan's 2014 calendar contained no fewer than 102 gigs in 11 months, some of which formed the final gigs for the Move, before Bevan and Burton went their separate ways again.

In 2014, Bevan joined Quill, a Birmingham-based band.

As of 2022, the Bev Bevan Band has played gigs with Bev's former school mate Jasper Carrott under the name 'Stand up and Rock' since 2017.

Personal life
He follows Wolverhampton Wanderers FC.

Bevan's first marriage was to Valerie Taylor. Their son, Adrian, was born in 1981. On 1st September 2022, Bev married Joy Brain (nee Strachan), his bandmate in Quill.

Bibliography

Timeline

References

Living people
English rock drummers
The Move members
Electric Light Orchestra members
Black Sabbath members
English radio presenters
Musicians from Birmingham, West Midlands
People educated at Moseley School
1944 births